The Cato Corporation is an American retailer of women's fashions and accessories. The company is headquartered in Charlotte, North Carolina. As of January 2016, the company operated 1,372 stores under the names Cato, Cato Plus, It's Fashion, It's Fashion Metro and Versona.

History

In 1946, the company founder, Wayland Cato, left United Merchants to launch his own business with his son, Wayland Henry Cato, Jr., and Edgar Thomas. The company went public in 1968, took itself private in 1980, then went public again in 1987. The company averted bankruptcy in the early 1990s after adopting a new discount pricing strategy and updated merchandise.

Cato stores are typically located in strip malls anchored by a national discounter like Walmart.

Store divisions
 Cato and Cato Plus—Junior, misses and plus sizes
 It's Fashion—Juniors, and Plus size
 It's Fashion Metro—Larger It's Fashion stores that also include clothing for men, big and tall men, infants and toddlers
 Versona -- "Exclusive" apparel and accessories

References

External links
Official Cato website
Official Versona website

Companies listed on the New York Stock Exchange
Clothing retailers of the United States
Companies based in Charlotte, North Carolina
American companies established in 1946
Retail companies established in 1946
1946 establishments in North Carolina
1960s initial public offerings
1980s initial public offerings